Anuradha Roy may refer to:

 Anuradha Roy (novelist) (born 1967), Indian novelist, journalist and editor
 Anuradha Roy (actress), Indian actress